The 1988–89 West Virginia Mountaineers men's basketball team represented West Virginia University as a member of the Atlantic-10 Conference during the 1988-89 season. The team played their home games at WVU Coliseum in Morgantown, West Virginia. Led by 11th-year head coach Gale Catlett,  the Mountaineers won 22 consecutive games, took home the conference regular season title, and received an at-large bid to the 1989 NCAA tournament as #7 seed in the East region.

Roster

Schedule and results

|-
!colspan=9 style=| Regular Season
|-

|-
!colspan=9 style=| Atlantic-10 Tournament

|-
!colspan=9 style=| NCAA Tournament

Rankings

References

West Virginia
West Virginia Mountaineers men's basketball seasons
West Virginia Mountaineers men's basketball
West Virginia Mountaineers men's basketball
West Virginia